Lawrence Ho Yau-lung (born 1977) is a Hong Kong-born Canadian businessman.  Starting his career as an investment banker at Jardine Fleming and Citibank, in 2001 he took over operations at Melco International. Later named chairman and CEO,  Ho refocused the company on leisure and entertainment,  building and operating casino resorts in Macau, the Philippines, and Cyprus. With an estimated net worth of $2.2 billion, he was named "Asia’s Best CEO" at the Asian Excellence Awards for the seventh time in 2018.

Born in Hong Kong from a Eurasian business family, Lawrence Ho was educated in Canada and graduated from the University of Toronto.

Early life and education
Ho is the only son and the youngest child of the Hong Kong- and Macau-based businessman Stanley Ho and his second wife Lucina Laam King Ying. He moved to Canada as a child, studied at Upper Canada College, and graduated from the University of Toronto with a bachelor's degree in commerce in 1999. He was awarded an honorary doctorate by Edinburgh Napier University, Scotland in July 2009.

Career

1999–2003: Banking and Mocha Clubs
In September 1999 Ho began working in investment banking, first at Jardine Fleming's Asia Derivatives Group and then at Citibank. Becoming a shareholder in iAsia Technology in 2000, that October he began managing iAsia's daily operations and was named president and vice-chairman.

After purchasing a 26 percent majority stake, in November 2001 Ho was appointed the group managing director of Melco International Development Limited. Placed in charge of Melco's daily operations, Ho began refocusing the company on leisure and entertainment. He renovated Melco's Jumbo restaurant brand and further expanded Melco into finances and technology, associating the firm with companies such as VC Brokerage and i-Asia.

The Macau territory of China began issuing new casino licenses in 2002, breaking Stanley Ho's monopoly on casinos in the region and presenting Melco with the opportunity to invest in Chinese gambling. Ho approached his father with a proposition to partner on new gambling projects, and Melco purchased a one-half stake in a planned casino resort from Stanley Ho for $13 million, agreeing to "participate in the development of the hotel and subsequently manage the electronic gaming machine lounge." Melco's Mocha Clubs, opened in 2003, helped introduce "cafe-style slot-machine parlors" to Macau, which were uncommon at the time.

2004–2011: CEO of Melco International
In 2004 Ho and Melco International partnered with James Packer's Australian casino company Crown Limited, creating the joint venture Melco Crown Entertainment. Ho was appointed CEO and executive director of Melco Crown Entertainment in December 2004, with both Ho and Packer appointed co-chairmen. In March 2006, Melco Crown spent US$900 million purchasing the last of Macau's six gaming licenses from Wynn Resorts. The license allowed Melco Crown to "operate an unlimited number of casinos, tables and machines in Macau until June 2022," and the company began developing its first casino.

Under Ho, by 2006 Melco International had become profitable. He was appointed Melco International's chairman and CEO on 15 March 2006, and Melco Crown listed on the NASDAQ in December 2006. In July 2007, Melco Crown launched Altira Macau, which was built for $1.45 billion.  In 2009, Melco Crown opened the $2.4 billion casino resort City of Dreams Macau in Cotai. Melco Crown listed its shares in Hong Kong at the end of 2011.

2012–2016: International expansion
Ho and Packer began partnering with SM Investments in 2012 on the $1 billion casino resort City of Dreams Manila, which opened in 2015 in the Philippines. In the summer of 2012, the government of the Primorye Integrated Entertainment Zone in Vladivostok, Russia invited Ho to bid on a new casino project. Tigre de Cristal opened in October 2015. With 60% ownership, in October 2015 Melco opened the casino resort Studio City Macau, which was designed with a Hollywood theme and cost $3.2 billion. In 2015 Ho served as the executive producer for the Martin Scorsese short film The Audition, which was filmed to promote the casino's opening.

At the start of 2016, Ho continued to control Melco International Development as CEO and chairman. Melco in turn controlled subsidiaries such as Entertainment Gaming Asia, which operated slot machines in Philippines and Cambodia.  In May 2016, Melco International became majority shareholder of its subsidiary Melco Resorts & Entertainment.

2017–2018: Recent casinos
After a year-long bidding process, in 2017 the Cyprus government awarded Melco the first and only casino license in the country, which granted exclusivity for 15 years. Melco International subsequently bought a controlling stake in the City of Dreams Mediterranean Casino.

After developing four integrated resorts together, in May 2017, Ho ended Melco's partnership with James Packer's Crown Resorts. With Crown's stake in the joint venture sold back to Melco International for $1.16 billion, Melco Crown became Melco Resorts & Entertainment. Ho assumed direct operational control of Melco Resorts & Entertainment, overseeing three resorts in Macau, eight Mocha Clubs, the resort in the Philippines, and the development in Cyprus.

After Japanese lawmakers pushed for legalized gambling in integrated resorts in 2016, by 2017 Ho was actively competing for one of an expected three licenses. According to Ho, Melco's pitch emphasized "entertainment and modernity". In June 2018, Melco Resorts & Entertainment opened Morpheus, a $1.1 billion hotel tower designed by Zaha Hadid at the City of Dreams Macau resort. In early 2019, Forbes estimated Ho's net worth at $2.2 billion, and ranked him as the #1008th richest person on the planet.  He was also listed among the 50 richest people in Hong Kong.

Boards and committees

The current chairman of Melco International, Ho is also on the boards of various companies such as Studio City International Holdings. He is chairman of  Maple Peak Investments in Canada and was previously the chairman of Summit Ascent Holdings.

He is a member of the National Committee of the Chinese People's Political Consultative Conference. He is also vice-chairman of the All-China Federation of Industry and Commerce.  He is an honorary lifetime member of the Chinese General Chamber of Commerce of Hong Kong, and he has also been a member of the All-China Youth Federation and the Macau Basic Law Promotion Association.

He has been chairman of the Chamber of Hong Kong Listed Companies and the Macau International Volunteers Association. A director executive of the Macao Chamber of Commerce, he is also on the boards of The Community Chest of Hong Kong and the Canadian Chamber of Commerce in Hong Kong. He is honorary president of Association of Property Agents and Real Estate Developers of Macau. Ho is also an honorary patron of the Canadian Chamber of Commerce in Macao.

Honours
Ho has won a number of awards for his career with Melco International. Institutional Investor named Ho “Best CEO" of a conglomerate in 2005, and also that year he received the "Directors of the Year Award" from the Hong Kong Institute of Directors and the 5th "China Enterprise Award for Creative Businessmen." In 2006 he was selected as one of “Ten Outstanding Young Persons" by Junior Chamber International Hong Kong. The following year he was named one of the “100 Most Influential People across Asia Pacific” by Asiamoney, and in 2008 he received the “China Charity Award” from the Ministry of Civil Affairs.

In 2009 Ho was named both “Young Entrepreneur of the Year” at the Asia Pacific Entrepreneurship Awards and one of the “Top Ten Financial and Intelligent Persons in China" by the Beijing Cultural Development Study Institute and Fortune Times. Ho was then selected by FinanceAsia as one of the “Best CEOs in Hong Kong” for the fifth time in 2014. Between 2012 and 2018 he received Asian Corporate Director Recognition Awards by Corporate Governance Asia,  and in 2015 he received the "Leadership Gold Award" in the Business Awards of Macau. He was also named “Asia’s Best CEO” at the Asian Excellence Awards for the seventh time in 2018.  In 2017, Ho was awarded the Medal of Merit-Tourism by the Macau SAR government for contributing to the territory's tourism.

Personal life
Ho and his wife Sharen Lo Shau Yan have one daughter.

References

1977 births
Living people
Hong Kong billionaires
Hong Kong casino industry businesspeople
Hong Kong emigrants to Canada
Hong Kong investment bankers
Hong Kong investors
Hong Kong people of Dutch-Jewish descent
University of Toronto alumni
Ho family